Sawyerpuram is a town panchayat in Tuticorin district, Tamil Nadu, India.

Microliths are found in large in numbers around Sawyerpuram (and additionally in Kulattur, Tirunelveli). They were found embedded in the fossil-bearing sand dunes. These available evidences in Sawyerpuram point the chronology of the Microlithic culture in South India to circa 4000 B.C.

Since the missionary Dr. G. U. Pope ministered in this place, the population is predominantly Christian.

Religions and cultures 

Religions:Hinduism & Christianity

Tamil culture is widely followed among the people living in Sawyerpuram whether they are Christians or Hindus.

Life expectancy and environment

The small town is known for peaceful environment and considered to be the cleanest small town in India with less population and the average life expectancy is 83.7 and which is higher than any small towns in India.

Education

List of colleges 
 Pope's College of Arts and Science
 Dr.G.U. Pope College of Engineering
 Dr.G.U. Pope College of Education
 Jeya Polytechnic College

List of schools 
 Pope Memorial Higher Secondary School
 St. Mary's Girls Higher Secondary School
 A.M.A.Hindu Higher Secondary School
 National Nursery and Primary School
 Martin Nursery and Primary School
 A.M.A Hindu Nursery and Primary School
 Gnanasigamani Evangelical Primary School
Joy Sharon Nursery and Primary School
The Vikasa School

Transportation 

Tuticorin Airport (going to be international in 3 years)
V.O. Chidambaranar Port Authority 34 km 
Trivandrum International Airport 192.2 km
Madurai International Airport 152.2 km
Tuticorin Railway Station 25 km

Natural resources and climate 

In summer the climate remains warm and on other seasons the climate can be cool and windy. This small town is also known for the  cultivation of bananas and rice because of its red soil and jack fruit, star fruit, jambul fruit, pea nut, cucumber are also cultivated in few places around the town.

References

Thoothukudi
Cities and towns in Thoothukudi district